Mame Seydina Issa Laye Thiaw (born 12 October 1992), commonly known as Issa Thiaw, is a Senegalese professional football coach and a former player who played as a midfielder. He is the Head coach of Kups academy squad of Finnish club KuPS.

Club career
Issa started his career at RS Yoff from Senegal, then played in Romania for various Liga I and Liga II clubs such as: Voința Sibiu, FC Cisnădie, Unirea Alba Iulia and Șoimii Pâncota. After a Liga I promotion with Sepsi OSK, he made his debut with Sepsi Osk in the first league on 16 July 2017, in a 0-1 defeat against Astra Giurgiu.

References

External links
 
 

1992 births
Living people
Senegalese footballers
Association football midfielders
Liga I players
Liga II players
CSU Voința Sibiu players
CSM Unirea Alba Iulia players
CS Șoimii Pâncota players
Sepsi OSK Sfântu Gheorghe players
Veikkausliiga players
FC Ilves players
Senegalese expatriate footballers
Senegalese expatriate sportspeople in Romania
Expatriate footballers in Romania
Senegalese expatriate sportspeople in Finland
Expatriate footballers in Finland